Kings Creek Falls, located near Long Creek, South Carolina, is a waterfall in the Oconee District of the Sumter National Forest.  Kings Creek is a tributary of the Chatooga River, and the falls are located off a short spur from the Foothills Trail.  It is located in the extreme Northwest of the state, near the Ellicott Rock Wilderness Area and the Georgia state line.

References

Waterfalls of South Carolina
Protected areas of Oconee County, South Carolina
Sumter National Forest
Landforms of Oconee County, South Carolina